Lake Owen is an unincorporated community in the town of Drummond, Bayfield County, Wisconsin, United States. The community is likely named for John Owen, a founder of the Rust-Owen Lumber Company, and a director of the Drummond & Southwestern Railroad.

References

Unincorporated communities in Bayfield County, Wisconsin
Unincorporated communities in Wisconsin